The 1999 Men's Oceania Cup was the second edition of the men's field hockey tournament. It was held from 13 to 16 May 1999 in Brisbane, Australia.

The tournament served as a qualifier for the 2000 Summer Olympics.

Australia won the tournament for the first time, defeating New Zealand in the three–game series, with two wins and one loss.

Results
All times are local (AEST).

Pool

Fixtures

Final standings

References

External links

1999
1999 in field hockey
1999 in Australian sport
1999 in New Zealand sport
1999 Oceania Cup
May 1999 sports events in Australia